Charles Lawrence Visnic (October 26, 1919 – June 27, 1994) was an American football guard, linebacker, and blocking back who played college football for St. Benedict's College (now known as Benedictine College) in Atchison, Kansas from 1940 to 1942 and professionally in the National Football League (NFL) for the New York Giants from 1943 to 1945. He appeared in 24 NFL games.

Early years
Visnic was born in 1918 in Jacobsburg, Ohio, and attended St. John's High School in Ohio and Belmont High School in North Carolina. He played college football at St. Benedict's College in Atchison, Kansas from 1940 to 1942. He was selected by the Associated Press as a second-team guard on the 1942 Little All-America football team. He was also selected as a first team player on the 1940 and 1942 All Central Conference football teams.

Professional football
Visnic was drafted by the New York Giants in the eight round (66th overall pick) of the 1943 NFL Draft. He played for the Giants for three seasons from 1943 to 1945, appearing as a guard in a total of 24 games, four of them as a starter. He had three interceptions for the Giants, one of which he returned for 41 yards in 1944.

Later years
Visnic died in 1994 at age 75.

References

1919 births
1994 deaths
American football guards
American football linebackers
New York Giants players
Benedictine Ravens football players
People from Belmont County, Ohio
Players of American football from North Carolina
Players of American football from Ohio